Pine Rivers is an electoral district of the Legislative Assembly in the Australian state of Queensland.

It was first created for the 1972 state election, based in the Shire of Pine Rivers in the northern outskirts of Brisbane. It was abolished in 1992 and replaced by Kurwongbah for the 1992 state election. The final member for Pine Rivers, Margaret Woodgate, transferred to Kurwongbah.

Pine Rivers was reintroduced for the 2009 state election, essentially as Kurwongbah renamed. The name change from Kurwongbah was made necessary due to the redistribution excising the eponymous suburb from the district. Originally proposed to be called Samsonvale by the Electoral Commission of Queensland, the name Pine Rivers was adopted after further review.

Members for Pine Rivers

Election results

References

External links
 

Pine Rivers
Shire of Pine Rivers